Portulaca intraterranea, the large pigweed, is a succulent herb native to deserts of central Australia.

The leaves are succulent, with flowers 2.5-3.5 cm wide. Aborigines eat the thick tap-root which tastes like potato.

References

Bushfood
intraterranea
Caryophyllales of Australia
Flora of New South Wales
Flora of Queensland
Eudicots of Western Australia
Flora of South Australia
Flora of the Northern Territory
Taxa named by John McConnell Black